This article contains information about the literary events and publications of 1776.

Events
January 8 – The English actor John Philip Kemble makes his stage début, as Theodosius in Nathaniel Lee's eponymous tragedy, at Wolverhampton, England, with the Crump and Chamberlain company.
August 7 – David Hume, weeks before his death, adds a codicil to his will, giving instructions for the publication of the Dialogues Concerning Natural Religion, on which he has been working since 1750.
unknown dates – The Wenyuan Chamber is built in China as an imperial library in the Forbidden City of Beijing.

New books

Fiction
Elizabeth Griffith – The Story of Lady Juliana Harley
Friedrich Heinrich Jacobi – Edward Allwill's Briefsammlung
Ignacy Krasicki – The Adventures of Mr. Nicholas Wisdom (Mikołaja Doświadczyńskiego przypadki) (first novel in Polish)
Samuel Jackson Pratt (as Courtney Melmoth) – The Pupil of Pleasure, or, The New System (Lord Chesterfield's) Illustrated

Drama
George Edward Ayscough (adapted from Voltaire) – Semiramis
Hannah Cowley – The Runaway
Samuel Foote – The Bankrupt
Johann Wolfgang von Goethe – Stella
Friedrich Maximilian Klinger – Sturm und Drang
Johann Anton Leisewitz – Julius of Taranto (first performed)
Jakob Michael Reinhold Lenz – The Soldiers (Die Soldaten)
Arthur Murphy – Three Weeks After Marriage
Heinrich Leopold Wagner – Die Kindermörderin
Lope de Vega (ed. Antonio de Sancha) – Obras sueltas

Poetry

James Beattie – Poems
Richard Graves – Euphrosyne
Hannah More – Sir Eldred of the Bower, and The Bleeding Rock
Jonathan Richardson – Morning Thoughts
John Scott – Amwell
Augustus Montague Toplady – Psalms and Hymns
William Whitehead – Variety
Gaspar Melchor de Jovellanos – Jovino a sus amigos de Salamanca

Non-fiction
John Adams – Thoughts on Government
James Beattie – Essays
Jeremy Bentham – Fragment on Government
Charles Burney – A General History of Music (completed 1789)
George Campbell – The Philosophy of Rhetoric
David Dalrymple – Annals of Scotland
Edward Gibbon – The History of the Decline and Fall of the Roman Empire, volume 1
Oliver Goldsmith – A Survey of Experimental Philosophy
Sir John Hawkins – A General History of the Science and Practice of Music
David Herd – Ancient and Modern Scottish Songs
Soame Jenyns – A View of the Internal Evidence of the Christian Religion
Thomas Paine
Common Sense
The American Crisis
Richard Price – Observations on the Nature of Civil Liberty
Adam Smith – An Inquiry into the Nature and Causes of the Wealth of Nations

Births
January – Frances Burney, English dramatist (died 1828)
January 17 – Jane Porter, Scottish novelist and dramatist (died 1850)
January 24 – E. T. A. Hoffmann, German fantasy and horror writer (died 1822)
February 12 – Richard Mant, English writer and cleric (died 1848)
March 9 – Archibald Bell, Scottish lawyer and miscellanist (died 1854)
April 13 – Wilhelm von Schütz, German author and playwright (died 1847)
July 1 – Sophie Gay, French author (died 1852)
September 21 – John Fitchett, English epic poet (died 1838)
September 27 – Maria Versfelt, Dutch actress and memoirist (died 1845)
November 16 – Mary Matilda Betham, English diarist, scholar and poet (died 1852)
November 20 – William Blackwood, Scottish publisher (died 1834)

Deaths
April 29 – Edward Wortley Montagu, English travel writer (born 1713)
May 23 – Jeanne Julie Éléonore de Lespinasse (Mademoiselle de Lespinasse), French salonnière (born 1732)
May 30 – Albert Frick, German theologian (born 1732)
June 2 – Robert Foulis, Scottish art critic and publisher (born 1707)
August 25 – David Hume, Scottish philosopher, historian and economist (born 1711)
October 17 – Pierre François le Courayer, French theologian (born 1681)

References

 
Years of the 18th century in literature